Montecristi Canton is a canton of Ecuador, located in the Manabí Province.  Its capital is the town of Montecristi.  Its population at the 2001 census was 43,400.

Demographics
Ethnic groups as of the Ecuadorian census of 2010:
Mestizo  75.6%
Montubio  9.6%
Afro-Ecuadorian  9.5%
White  5.0%
Indigenous  0.1%
Other  0.3%

References

Cantons of Manabí Province